WeRide is an international L4 autonomous driving technology company. Holding the driverless test permits both in the U.S. and China, WeRide is operating one of the world's largest autonomous driving fleets in more than 25 cities around the world. WeRide offers an all-rounded product mix of Robotaxi, Mini Robobus, Robovan, Robo Street Sweeper and Advanced Driving Solution, covering smart services in ride-hailing, on-demand bus, urban logistics, environmental sanitation and L2/L3 solutions. 

WeRide has formed strategic partnerships with globally leading OEMs and Tier 1 suppliers including Renault-Nissan-Mitsubishi Alliance, Yutong Group, GAC Group, Bosch, etc.

History 
Established in Silicon Valley in 2017, WeRide now has expanded its R&D and operation centers to San Jose, Abu Dhabi, Singapore, Guangzhou, Beijing, Shanghai and Shenzhen. The Company was founded by Tony Han who was the former Chief Scientist of Baidu's Autonomous Driving Unit. The company has grown to over 1000 employees around the globe over the past 5 years.

In November 2020, WeRide announced that a total of 147,128 trips were completed for more than 60,000 passengers during its first year of Robotaxi service. Marking its one-year anniversary of Robotaxi operation, WeRide has partnered with Institute of Transportation Engineering, Tsinghua University, to conduct a Robotaxi passenger survey and publish China's First Robotaxi Passenger Survey Report.

In January 2021, WeRide unveiled world's 1st purpose-built L4 Mini Robobus, announcing the launch of its regular testing and reservation-based services to the public.

In April 2021, WeRide obtained the fully driverless test permit from DMV, making it the first autonomous driving company to get the fully driverless test permit both in the US and China.

In September 2021, WeRide forayed into urban logistics industry and unveiled WeRide Robovan, the very first L4 self-driving cargo van.

In December 2021, WeRide completed autonomous taxi trial on Yas Island in UAE, by partnering with Bayanat. WeRide developed the full stack autonomous driving software and hardware solutions as well as operating and monitoring systems for the TAXI app.

In May 2022, WeRide received strategic investment from Bosch and both parties will jointly develop ADAS solution. This cooperation will accelerate the process of developing Bosch China's advanced driving solution, moving SAE Level 2-3 AD towards mass production.

In September 2022, WeRide collaborated with the Saudi Company for Artificial Intelligence (SCAI) to launch of the first dynamic display route of the driverless robobus (WeRide Mini Robobus) at the 2022 Global AI Summit held in Riyadh, the capital of Saudi Arabia. This is the first fully driverless test ride of robobus in the Middle East country.

Financing 
In September 2017, WeRide completed a $52 million Pre-A round led by Qiming Venture Partners, Sinovation Ventures, NVIDIA and others.

In October 2018, WeRide Closed its Series A funding round, with Renault-Nissan-Mitsubishi Alliance as the lead investor.

In January 2021, WeRide raised $310 million in Series B round after completing Series B2 and B3. It raised $200 million from Yutong Group, the strategic lead investor on the deal.  Qiming Venture Partners, Sinovation Ventures and Kinzon Capital, who were involved in the previous rounds, also participated in the funding.

In May 2021, WeRide closed another $310 million Series C round at a $3.3 billion valuation. This funding round was invested by IDG Capital, Hechuang Investment, CoStone Capital, Cypress Star, Sky9 Capital, and K3 Ventures. Some institutes involved in WeRide's previous funding rounds, such as CMC Capital, Qiming Venture Partners, and AlpView Capital are also among the investors list. 

In December 2021, WeRide received strategic investment from GAC Group. This investment will further the joint development and manufacturing of a fleet of purpose-built Robotaxis.

In January 2022, WeRide completed series D funding round, jointly led by a reputable China-UAE joint sovereign fund, Asia Investment Capital, Bosch, GAC Group, and Carlyle Investment Group, boosting the company's valuation to US$4.4 billion.

WeRide One 
WeRide One is a universal autonomous driving technology platform which can be directly applied in a wide range of urban-centered use cases integrating full-stack software algorithms, modularized hardware solutions, and a cloud-based infrastructure platform. WeRide has designed and developed WeRide One in-house and WeRide believes WeRide One sets them apart from their competitors and gives them a fundamental advantage.

Products

Robotaxi 
WeRide has partnered with world-class OEMs including GAC and Nissan to manufacture purpose-built robotaxis. Its L4 Robotaxi services are available to the public through its self-developed WeRide App, as well as third-party ride hailing apps.

Mini Robobus 
In cooperation with Yutong Group, WeRide is the first in the world to develop fully driverless L4 mini robous that is designed for mass production. With a speed limit of 40km/h, this Robobus gives passengers a fully autonomous driving experience with no steering wheel or driver cabin.

Robovan 
WeRide has partnered with JMC-Ford Motors to develp Robovan for intra-city logistics service since September 2021, aiming to help express delivery companies reduce labor costs and improve delivery efficiency.

Robo Street Sweeper 
WeRide is the first in the world to develop a purpose-built L4 robo street sweeper, which features a cockpit-free design. With no driver cabin, this robo street sweeper boasts a large tank volume of six ton with 3.5m3 water capacity and NEDC range of 300 kilometers. It can handle various urban cleaning needs such as standard road washing and sweeping, road edge cleaning, dust suppression, and high-pressure water jetting.

WePilot 
WeRide formed a strategic partnership with Bosch, the world's largest Tier 1 supplier by market share, to provide L2+/L3 advanced driving solutions to OEMs. The partnership combines WeRide's algorithm and software stack with Bosch's solid industrialization capabilities and engineering competences on top of a strong OEM customer base.

References 

Self-driving car companies
Technology companies established in 2017
Transport companies established in 2017
American companies established in 2017
2017 establishments in California
Companies based in Guangzhou